The Colisée Cardin is an indoor arena located in Sorel-Tracy, Quebec. It was built in 1954 and has a capacity of 3,037 people. It once hosted the Sorel Éperviers of the QMJHL. The arena's primary tenant today are the Sorel-Tracy Éperviers of the LNAH.

Buildings and structures in Montérégie
Indoor ice hockey venues in Quebec
Indoor arenas in Quebec
Quebec Major Junior Hockey League arenas
Sports venues in Quebec
Sport in Sorel-Tracy